Green Memorial or Greene Memorial may refer to the following:

Buildings and structures
Golders Green War Memorial in Golders Green, North London, UK
Green Memorial A.M.E. Zion Church in Portland, Maine
Green Memorial Hospital in Manipay, Sri Lanka
Islington Green War Memorial in Islington, London, UK
Kettering Health Greene Memorial Hospital in Xenia, Ohio
Thomas A. Greene Memorial Museum in Milwaukee, Wisconsin
Wood Green War Memorial in Haringey, London, UK

Organizations
Philip Green Memorial Trust